Aarons Creek is a  long 3rd order tributary to the Dan River in Halifax County, Virginia.  Aarons Creek forms the boundary of Halifax and Mecklenburg Counties, Virginia up to the Dan River.

Variant names
According to the Geographic Names Information System, it has also been known historically as:
 Aaron Creek
 Aaron's Creek
 Crooked Fork
 Tewa-ho-mony Creek
 Tewahominy
 Tewakominy Creek
 Tewaw-hommini Creek

Course 
Aarons Creek rises in a pond about 5 miles northeast of Allensville, North Carolina, in Person County and then flows north-northeast through Granville County, North Carolina and into Virginia to join the Dan River about 1 mile northeast of Aarons Creek.

Watershed 
Aarons Creek drains  of area, receives about 45.6 in/year of precipitation, has a wetness index of 421.02, and is about 56% forested.

See also 
 List of Virginia Rivers
 List of North Carolina Rivers

References 

Rivers of North Carolina
Rivers of Virginia
Rivers of Granville County, North Carolina
Rivers of Person County, North Carolina
Rivers of Halifax County, Virginia
Rivers of Mecklenburg County, Virginia
Tributaries of the Roanoke River